Des Moines is a village in Union County, New Mexico, United States. The population was 143 at the 2010 census. Des Moines is a small village surrounded by large cattle ranches. The population in 2018 was 20% lower than it was in 2000. Des Moines is known for its educational services, construction, and agriculture. The general cost of living index for Des Moines is 84.9. Family Guy writer Mark Hentemann was born in Des Moines.

History
A post office called Des Moines has been in operation since 1906. The village took its name after Des Moines, Iowa.

Geography
Des Moines is located at  (36.760167, -103.835317).

Demographics

As of the census of 2000, there were 143 people, 72 households, and 37 families residing in the village. The racial makeup of the village was 88.1% White (65.7% non-Hispanic white), 1.4% Native American, 7.0% from other races, and 3.5% from two or more races. Hispanic or Latino of any race were 30.8% of the population.

As of the 2000 census There were 72 households, out of which 36.1% had children under the age of 18 living with them, 52.8% were married couples living together, 8.3% had a female householder with no husband present, and 30.6% were non-families. 29.2% of all households were made up of individuals, and 12.5% had someone living alone who was 65 years of age or older. The average household size was 2.46 and the average family size was 3.00.

In the village, the population was spread out, with 30.5% under the age of 18, 5.6% from 18 to 24, 27.1% from 25 to 44, 23.7% from 45 to 64, and 13.0% who were 65 years of age or older. The median age was 38 years. For every 100 females, there were 78.8 males. For every 100 females age 18 and over, there were 95.2 males.

The median income for a household in the village was $27,321, and the median income for a family was $40,833. Males had a median income of $21,042 versus $33,750 for females. The per capita income for the village was $16,255. About 25.6% of families and 31.6% of the population were below the poverty line, including 49.3% of those under the age of eighteen and 26.9% of those 65 or over.

References

External links 
Des Moines article and photo gallery

Villages in Union County, New Mexico
Villages in New Mexico